The Santo Antão Island League (South) is a regional championship played in Porto Novo, Santo Antão Island, Cape Verde. The winner of the championship plays in Cape Verdean football Championships of each season.  The championship is organized by the Santo Antão South Regional Football Association (Associação Regional de Futebol de Zona Sul do Santo Antão, ARFZSSA).  It has one of the fewest teams in the Capeverdean football or soccer ahead of Brava's and São Nicolau's.  Its current head is Fernando Lima since late 2016.

About the Island/Regional League
Before 2002, the top two champions competed into the single island competition until 2003.

Until the early 2000s was the only island league in Cape Verde to have all of its football clubs in one town and also where there are no teams in the western half (though included) of the island due to a slightly low population, now the population compared to the eastern part is around half.  The clubs are throughout the area.

Académica has the most number of island titles with twelve, second is Sporting with three, third is Maritimo with two and Fiorentina with a title won in 2008.

Académica Porto Novo was the first champ won in 1998, Marítimo became the second champ a year later, Académica won their second a year later, the club won two more in 2005 minus the cancelled 2004 season. Sporting won two consecutive in 2007, Fiorentina won their only title in 2008, Sporting again with their recent title in 2009 and Marítimo's second and recent title in 2010.  Académica has recently won seven consecutive champ titles in 2017, of any regional championships, it became the next club after Botafogo of Fogo and Mindelense of São Vicente to do so.

Académica Porto Novo holds the record having not a single loss in 60 matches, the record includes that of the South Zone Cup and the Super Cup which totals about 70.  The record lasted from 2011 to April 23, 2016.  Académica's next loss in a few seasons was at the final week losing to their second rival Marítimo 2-1. Overall in any of the island leagues, Académica had about four years without a loss, though in a championship with a club less than São Vicente's and no second division, the record is tied with CS Mindelense's. Académica's overall 13 total is more than any club who has the second most championship titles of any region except Fogo.

One of the teams that scored the most goals in a season was Académica do Porto Novo numbering 60.  One of the highest scoring matches in the championship was Académica who defeated Sporting with a high scoring match of 11-0 on week 13, the final match of the 2016 season.

Santo Antão Island League (South) - Clubs 2017/18
 Académica Porto Novo
 Fiorentina Porto Novo
 Inter Porto Novo
 Marítimo - Porto Novo
 Sanjoanense - Ribeira da Pratas
 Sporting Porto Novo

Withdrawn clubs
 Lajedos
 Santo André - based in Ribeira da Cruz
 Tarrafal FC de Monte Trigo

Winners
1997/98 : Académica do Porto Novo
1998/99 : Marítimo (Porto Novo)
1999/00 : Académica do Porto Novo
2000-02 : not held as the Santo Antão Island League continued without the two zones
2002/03 : Académica do Porto Novo
2003/04 : not held
2004/05 : Académica do Porto Novo
2005/06 : Sporting Clube do Porto Novo
2006/07 : Sporting Clube do Porto Novo
2007/08 : Grupo Desportivo, Recreativo e Cultural Fiorentina
2008/09 : Sporting Clube do Porto Novo
2009/10 : Marítimo (Porto Novo)
2010/11 : Académica Porto Novo
2011/12 : Académica Porto Novo
2012/13 : Académica Porto Novo
2013/14 : Académica Porto Novo
2014/15 : Académica Porto Novo
2015-16: Académica Porto Novo
2016-17: Académica Porto Novo
2017–18:  Académica Porto Novo

Performance by club

Seasons by club
The left indicates the participation in the South Zone, inside the bracket is overall participation as one island and the South Zone.

See also
Porto Novo Cup
Porto Novo Super Cup
Porto Novo Opening Tournament

References

External links
Santo Antão Island League (North) 

 
Second level football leagues in Cape Verde
1997 establishments in Cape Verde
Sports leagues established in 1997